József Madaras (16 August 1937 – 24 April 2007) was a Hungarian film actor. He appeared in more than 80 films between 1958 and 2006.

Selected filmography
 Tales of a Long Journey (1963)
 The Round-Up (1965)
 The Red and the White (1967)
 Silence and Cry (1968)
 The Confrontation (1969)
 Horizon (1971)
 Electra, My Love (1974)
 Budapest Tales (1976)
 Man Without a Name (1976)
 Nobody's Daughter (1976)
 My Father's Happy Years (1977)
 A ménesgazda (1978)
 Hungarian Rhapsody (1979)
 The Fortress (1979)
 Köszönöm, megvagyunk (1981)
 Season of Monsters (1987)
 Howling V: The Rebirth (1989)
 The Summer Guest (1992)
 Relatives (2006)

External links

1937 births
2007 deaths
Hungarian male film actors
People from Mureș County